"Too Late For Hallelujah" is a single by the Dublin group Aslan. Originally recorded by Boyzone on their 2010 album Brother, it is taken from Aslan's album Nudie Books & Frenchies and was released on 2 March 2012, reaching number 28 on the Irish Singles Chart. 

 On 24 May 2012, the band performed the song live on Craig Doyle Live on RTÉ Two.

Chart positions

References

External links
Youtube Video

2012 singles
Aslan (band) songs
2010 songs
EMI Records singles
Songs written by Don Mescall
Songs written by Carl Falk
Songs written by Sharon Vaughn